Amanda González Gutiérrez (born 21 January 1979 in Santander, Cantabria) is a former female field hockey player from Spain. She was a member of the Women's National Team at the 2000 Summer Olympics. There the team ended up in fourth place under the guidance of Dutch coach Marc Lammers. She played club hockey for Sardinero Caja Cantabria.

References

External links
 

1979 births
Living people
Field hockey players from Cantabria
Sportspeople from Santander, Spain
Spanish female field hockey players
Olympic field hockey players of Spain
Field hockey players at the 2000 Summer Olympics